The Young Swingers is a 1963 American musical comedy film directed by Maury Dexter and written by Harry Spalding. The film stars Rod Lauren, Molly Bee, Gene McDaniels, Jack Larson, Karen Gunderson and Jo Helton. The film was released in September 1963 by 20th Century Fox.

It was known as Come to the Party.

Plot

Vicki Crawford's aunt owns a building currently being used as a nightclub. Vicki takes a job there and falls in love with singer Mel Hudson, together hoping her Aunt Roberta will change her mind about tearing the building down.

A party is planned for Vicki's 21st birthday, but the club is destroyed by a fire. Vicki suspects her aunt of arson, but Mel proves to her satisfaction that faulty wiring was responsible for the blaze. Roberta has a change of heart, and she is willing to build a new club for Vicki and the other performers.

Cast 
Rod Lauren as Mel Hudson
Molly Bee as Vicki Crawford
Gene McDaniels as Fred Lewis
Jack Larson as Pete Mundy
Karen Gunderson as Judi Sherwood
Jo Helton as Roberta Crawford
John Merritt as Ken Sherwood
Justin Smith as Bruce Webster
Jerry Summers as Roger Kelly		
Jack Younger as Irving Bird

References

External links 
 

1963 films
1960s English-language films
20th Century Fox films
American musical comedy films
1963 musical comedy films
Films directed by Maury Dexter
Beach party films
1960s American films